Blossom Films is a production company founded by American-born Australian actress Nicole Kidman in 2010. The first production by the company was the film Rabbit Hole, based on the play of the same name by David Lindsay-Abaire.

History
In 2010, Kidman launched the production company Blossom Films together with Per Saari. The first project was Rabbit Hole starring Nicole Kidman, Dianne Wiest and Aaron Eckhart, followed by Monte Carlo starring Selena Gomez and Leighton Meester. The company also produced a film adaption of The Family Fang starring Jason Bateman and Kidman.

In June 2018, Blossom films signed a first-look deal with Amazon Studios for features, television series and digital content. Under the pact, Amazon and Kidman's Blossom Films will develop original series that will be available exclusively on Amazon Prime Video, as well as movies for theatrical release.

Upcoming projects
In May 2019, Hulu gave a straight-to-series order to the adaptation of Nine Perfect Strangers by Liane Moriarty, set to premiere in 2020. In July 2019, it was announced that WarerMedia’s streaming service is developing a drama series titled Crime Farm with Kidman attached to executive produce under Blossom Films.

Filmography

Films

Television

References

External links 
 

Nicole Kidman
Film production companies of the United States
Entertainment companies established in 2010
American companies established in 2010